Jaan Mahlapuu (11 November (or 9 November) 1894 in Valga –  in Riga) was an Estonian fighter pilot for the Imperial Russian Air Service in World War I. He is known for being the first ace of Estonian origin.

In 1915, he graduated from the Pskov Flight School. After graduating, he was transferred to the front of Riga, where he reputedly shot down five or six German airplanes. After he had participated in the victorious battle over Riga, he was named the Honor Citizen of Riga.

In August 1917, Jaan Mahlapuu died from an airplane accident.

Sources
Russian Fighter Aces of 1914 - 1924 

1894 births
1917 deaths
Estonian military personnel of World War I
Estonian aviators
Russian military personnel killed in World War I
Imperial Russian Air Force personnel
Aviators killed in aviation accidents or incidents
People from Valga, Estonia
Victims of aviation accidents or incidents in 1917